Pongrácz or Pongratz is a surname. Notable people with the surname include:

István Pongrácz (1584–1619), Hungarian Jesuit priest
Jenő Pongrácz (1852–1933), Hungarian jurist
József Pongrácz (1891-?), Hungarian wrestler
Viktor Pongrácz (born 1998), Hungarian football player
Zoltán Pongrácz (1912–2007), Hungarian composer